Leomar S. Najorda (born February 16, 1982, in Bangui, Ilocos Norte) is a Filipino professional basketball player for the Koponang Lakan ng Bulacan in the Pilipinas Super League. He was drafted ninth overall by the Red Bull Barako in the 2005 PBA draft.

References

External links

1982 births
Living people
Small forwards
Filipino men's basketball players
San Sebastian Stags basketball players
Ilocano people
People from Ilocos Norte
Basketball players from Ilocos Norte
Barako Bull Energy Boosters players
Barako Bull Energy players
Magnolia Hotshots players
NorthPort Batang Pier players
Maharlika Pilipinas Basketball League players
Barako Bull Energy Boosters draft picks